Dowlatabad-e Olya (also Romanized as Dowlatābād-e ‘Olyā; also known as Daulatābād and Dowlatābād) is a village in Mahidasht Rural District, Mahidasht District, Kermanshah County, Kermanshah Province, Iran. At the 2006 census, its population was 139, in 26 families.

References 

Populated places in Kermanshah County